Ch'api Qullu (Aymara ch'api thorn, qullu mountain,"thorn mountain", hispanicized spelling Chapi Kkollu) is a mountain in the Bolivian Cordillera Occidental situated on the western shore of the Uyuni salt pan. It is approximately 3,917 m high reaching a prominence of about 350 m. The mountain is located near the village of Canquella in the Potosí Department, Daniel Campos Province, Llica Municipality.

See also
 Ch'alla Qullu
 Wila Qullu
 List of mountains in the Andes

References 

Mountains of Potosí Department